Bailly-Romainvilliers is a commune in the Seine-et-Marne department in the Île-de-France region in north-central France.

Demographics
The inhabitants of the town of Bailly-Romainvilliers are called Romainvillersois, Romainvillersoises in French. Bailly-Romainvilliers is home to a Marriott complex of villas. The town is a popular place to stay, because of its convenient location near Disneyland Paris, and Paris itself. The shopping precinct is home to a bakery, parking facilities and a Carrefour Market supermarket.

Schools
The community has three primary schools, Alizés, Coloriades, and Girandoles; as well as one junior high school, Collège Les Blés d'Or.

Lycée Émilie du Châtelet, the area senior high school/sixth-form college, is in nearby Serris.

See also
Communes of the Seine-et-Marne department

References

External links

Home page 
1999 Land Use, from IAURIF (Institute for Urban Planning and Development of the Paris-Île-de-France région) 

Communes of Seine-et-Marne
Val d'Europe